Blue Pills (original title: Pilules Bleues) is a 2001 Swiss-French autobiographical comic written and illustrated by Frederik Peeters.
The comic tells the story of a man falling in love with an HIV-positive woman.

The book won the 2001 Prix de la ville de Genève pour la bande dessinée and the 2002 Prix Alph'Art.

In 2014 the graphic novel was adapted into a TV film, directed by Jean-Philippe Amar and broadcast on Arte.

References

Swiss comic strips
French comic strips
Swiss graphic novels
French graphic novels
2001 graphic novels
2001 comics debuts
2001 comics endings
Autobiographical graphic novels
Drama comics
Romance comics
HIV/AIDS in comics
French comics adapted into films